Andrew Reed was an American Negro league third baseman in the 1910s.

Reed played for the Detroit Stars and the St. Louis Giants in 1919. In three recorded games, he posted three hits in 12 plate appearances.

References

External links
Baseball statistics and player information from Baseball-Reference Black Baseball Stats and Seamheads

Year of birth missing
Year of death missing
Place of birth missing
Place of death missing
Detroit Stars players
St. Louis Giants players
Baseball third basemen